Orchesella kervillei is a species of slender springtail in the family Entomobryidae.

References

Collembola
Animals described in 1932